Tony Lawson is a British philosopher and economist. He is professor of economics and philosophy in the Faculty of Economics at the University of Cambridge. He is a co-editor of the Cambridge Journal of Economics, a former director of the University of Cambridge Centre for Gender Studies, and co-founder of the Cambridge Realist Workshop and the Cambridge Social Ontology Group. Lawson is noted for his contributions to heterodox economics and to philosophical issues in social theorising, most especially to social ontology.

Work

Economics 
Lawson's early contributions were on philosophical topics such as uncertainty, knowledge and prediction as well as on substantive analyses of the labour process and the industrial decline of the United Kingdom. Lawson's further work has focussed on achieving greater relevance in social theorising, especially economics. This has involved developing an ontologically informed critique of mainstream economics and elaborating methods more relevant to social analysis. Perhaps most importantly, Lawson has introduced ontological reflection into all aspects of economic discussion, including methodology, basic theory and history of economic thought. Lawson argues repeatedly that if social science is to be successful then it must fashion methods that are appropriate to its subject matter. He argues that this requires an explicit orientation to social ontology. The reason that mathematical modelling in economics fails to provide insight, he reasons, is simply because such methods are quite inappropriate, given the nature of social material. Lawson develops dialectical methods that he systematises as contrast explanation. More basically Lawson advocates pluralism in method for modern economics.

Philosophy 
As a result of his argument that economics should concern itself with ontology, Lawson has developed and defended his own theory of the constitution and nature of social reality. The main philosophical influence for this is the Cambridge Social Ontology Group. An early influence was the work of Roy Bhaskar. Indeed, in his early work, Lawson joined Bhaskar and others in referring to the account of social reality defended as "transcendental realism". Since 1997, however, Lawson has developed his own conception of social ontology, largely in collaboration with the Cambridge Social Ontology Group, and refers to it as social positioning theory.

Social ontology 
Lawson's conception of social ontology has been in part derived through transcendental argument. He defines as social anything "whose formation/coming into existence and/or continuing existence necessarily depend at least in part upon human beings and their interactions”. Lawson argues that there is a level of emergent – from human interaction – reality that is reasonably demarcated as social. This comes about through processes of social morphogenesis. In general, Lawson argues, “we human beings for the most part do not create social reality, but rather, on finding it given to us at each moment, each draw upon it in acting in always situated ways, pursuing our particular situated concerns, in conditions clearly not of our own making, with understandings that are always fallible and extremely partial at best, and in so doing thereby contribute, along with the simultaneous actions of all others, to the continuous reproduction and transformation of social reality in a manner that is mostly unintended and poorly understood”. 

The result is a world in which human agency and social structure each presuppose the other though neither is reducible to, or completely explicable in terms of, the other. More specifically, Lawson argues that social reality is everywhere constituted through positioning people and things as components of social totalities, whereupon human actions and uses of positioned objects are guided by rights and obligations associated with the positions. Whole communities can also be so positioned, as in the formation of corporations. The result is a social realm organised by various forms of social structure of which there different types such as communities, collective practices, norms, social rules, social positions, powers, social relations, and artefacts.

Ethics 
Lawson defends a conception of ethics named Critical Ethical Naturalism in which the goal is a society in which we all flourish in our differences, and the mechanism ever nudging us towards it turns on the fact that the flourishing of any one of us depends on the flourishing of all and at some level we all recognise this.

Debates 
Lawson has engaged in debates with numerous contributors, including, early on, over the use of econometrics, and later, regarding the value of ontology to social theorising, including to feminist theorising. In addition, Edward Fullbrook’s Ontology and Economics: Tony Lawson and his Critics, contains a series of debates between Lawson and leading heterodox economists. Recently Lawson has debated the relative advantages of competing conceptions of social ontology with several ontologists such as John Searle, Doug Porpora and Colin Wight. Moreover, he has debated the nature of specific social existents, such as money, with Searle and Geoffrey Ingham.

Bibliography

Books (single author)

Selected articles

Secondary sources 

 "Cambridge social ontology, the philosophical critique of modern economics and social positioning theory: an interview with Tony Lawson, part 1". Journal of Critical Realism. 20:1, 72-97. 2021.

"Cambridge social ontology, the philosophical critique of modern economics and social positioning theory: an interview with Tony Lawson, part 2". Journal of Critical Realism. 20:2, 201-237. 2021.

References 

British economists
Year of birth missing (living people)
Living people